Disney's Riviera Resort is a Disney Vacation Club resort at the Walt Disney World Resort in Bay Lake, Florida. It was built by Disney Parks, Experiences, and Products between Epcot and Disney's Hollywood Studios. It is the first newly constructed resort to be served by the Disney Skyliner gondola system and the 15th Disney Vacation Club property to be built.  The resort is themed after Walt Disney's trips and experiences in Europe and a love of the French and Italian Riviera. A collection of his travel images are incorporated into the resort's decor. Popular Disney characters are also painted into the overall theme of the resort including known characters' boat storage. It opened on December 16, 2019.

History
Plans for the 300-room resort were released during the D23 Expo in 2017. The Riviera resort is also one of two hotels announced during the 2017 D23 Expo, the other being Star Wars: Galactic Starcruiser. The Riviera Resort is one of the 23 improvements to Disney Parks announced during D23. It is the first entirely new Disney Vacation Club Resort built since Aulani.

Being a part of the Disney Vacation Club, The Riviera Resort offers guests multiple room styles ranging from Tower or Deluxe studios to one-, two-, or three-bedroom villas. Villas include accommodations for up to 12 guests.

Dining

Within the resort, guests have four options for food and beverage:
 Le Petite Café, named after the Disney film The Aristocats, offers breakfast and lounge service.
 Primo Piatto is a quick-service restaurant that offers breakfast, lunch, and dinner.
 Topolino's Terrace - Flavors of the Riviera is the rooftop, sit-down "signature" experience located at the top of the resort, serving breakfast and dinner. Fireworks shows at EPCOT and Disney's Hollywood Studios are within view during dinner service.
 Bar Riva is an open-air pool bar.

In addition to four restaurants, the "La Boutique" gift shop in the lobby offers a small selection of grocery options like frozen, canned, and pre-made meals, due to the fact the resort largely offers suites with kitchens and caters to Disney Vacation Club members.

Amenities

The Riviera Resort has a full-size pool, a leisure pool, and a shallow interactive splash area for small children. 

La Boutique is the Disney merchandise store on-premises.

Resort guests are also given access to Early Theme Park Entry, which allows guests to enter the Disney parks early. As with other Disney resorts, The Riviera uses Magic Bands for room key access.

References

Riviera Resort
Hotel buildings completed in 2019
Disney Vacation Club